The Conroe Bridge, also known as Clark's Creek Bridge, is a Rainbow Arch bridge over Clark's Creek near Junction City, Kansas which was built in 1925.  It was listed on the National Register of Historic Places in 1983.

It was built to a design by James Barney Marsh.

References

Bridges on the National Register of Historic Places in Kansas
Bridges completed in 1925
National Register of Historic Places in Geary County, Kansas
Bridges in Kansas